Richard Morris (9 July 1921 – 9 November 1995) was a British middle-distance runner. He competed in the men's 1500 metres at the 1948 Summer Olympics.

References

1921 births
1995 deaths
Athletes (track and field) at the 1948 Summer Olympics
British male middle-distance runners
Olympic athletes of Great Britain
Place of birth missing